Guató may refer to:
the Guató people, an ethnic group of Brazil and Bolivia
the Guató language, a language of Brazil and Bolivia

See also 
 Gwato, a town in Nigeria
 Gato (disambiguation)

Language and nationality disambiguation pages